Ntokou-Pikounda National Park is a  protected area in the Congo Basin of the Republic of the Congo. The park is known as the "Green Abyss" from J. Michael Fay's MegaTransect. The park was created primarily to protect an estimated population of 15,000 lowland gorillas on 28 December 2012 when the Congolese Ministerial Council and President Denis Sassou Nguesso adopted the Decree Establishing the Ntokou-Pikounda National Park. The park also has an estimated 8,000 forest elephants and 950 chimpanzees. The towns and villages surrounding the park have a combined population of 25,000-30,000 people, and few services exist for tourists.

References

National parks of the Republic of the Congo
Protected areas established in 2012